Fritz Hommel (31 July 1854 – 17 April 1936) was a German Orientalist.

Biography 
Hommel was born in Ansbach. He studied in Leipzig and was habilitated in 1877 in Munich, where in 1885, he became an extraordinary professor of Semitic languages. He became a full professor in 1892, and after his retirement in 1925, continued to give lectures at the University of Munich. He was the doctoral supervisor of Muhammad Iqbal, who wrote the thesis The Development of Metaphysics in Persia under his supervision.

He was intrigued by linguistical problems, and also interested in the history of the Middle East and its connection with culture and intellectual life. He excelled in studies of cuneiform literature, ancient Arabic poetry, old Turkic inscriptions and Egyptian pyramid texts.

He died at the age of 81 in Munich.

Works
Among his better written efforts were a history of Babylonia and Assyria, Geschichte Babyloniens und Assyriens (1885) and a highly regarded work on the geography and history of the ancient Near East, titled: Grundriss der Geographie und Geschichte des Alten Orients (1904). Other significant writings by Hommel include:
Die äthiopische Übersetzung des Physiologus (1877) – Ethiopian translation of the Physiologus
Die Namen der Säugetiere bei den südsemitischen Völkern (1879).
Zwei Jagdinschriften Asurbanipals (1879).
Die semitischen Völker und Sprachen. Bd. 1 (1883) – Semitic peoples and languages.
Die älteste arabische Baarlam-Version (1887) – The oldest Arabic version of Barlaam. 
Abriß der Geschichte des alten Orients (1887) – Outline on the history of the ancient Orient.
Der babylonische Ursprung der ägyptischen Kultur (1892) – The Babylonian origin of Egyptian culture.
Aufsätze und Abhandlungen arabistisch-Semitologischen Inhalts Bd. I-III (1892–1901) – Essays and treatises of Arabic-Semitological content.
Südarabische Chrestomathie (1893) – South Arabian anthology.
Sumerische Lesestücke (1894) – Sumerian readings.
Geschichte des alten Morgenlandes (1904).
Die altisraelische Überlieferung in inschriftlicher Beleuchtung (1896).
Der Gestirndienst der alten Araber und die altisraelische Überlieferung (1900).
Vier neue arabische Landschaftsnamen im Alten Testament (1901) – Four new Arab landscape names in the Old Testament.
Zwei hundert sumero-türkische Wortvergleichungen (1915) – 200 Sumerian-Turkish word comparisons.

References 

 List of published works copied from an equivalent article at the German Wikipedia, whose sources are listed as:
 
  Catalog of the German National Library
 Estate of Fritz Hommel at the Bavarian State Library

German orientalists
German scholars
People from Ansbach
People from the Kingdom of Bavaria
Leipzig University alumni
Ludwig Maximilian University of Munich alumni
Academic staff of the Ludwig Maximilian University of Munich
1854 births
1936 deaths
German male non-fiction writers
Paleolinguists
Linguists of Sumerian